Hilary Mavis Graham,  (born 1950) is a British sociologist and social policy academic, who specialises in public health. Since 2005, she has been Professor of Health Sciences at the University of York. She previously lectured at the University of Bradford, the Open University, Coventry Polytechnic, the University of Warwick, and Lancaster University.

Early life and education
In 1968, Graham matriculated into the University of York to study sociology. She then completed Bachelor of Arts (BA), Master of Arts (MA), and Doctor of Philosophy (DPhil) degrees. Her doctoral thesis, which was completed in 1980, was titled "Having a baby: women's experiences of pregnancy, childbirth and early motherhood".

Academic career
Graham began her academic career as a lecturer in social policy at the University of Bradford. She then moved to the Open University, where she was a researcher in the Faculty of Social Sciences. In the 1980s, she joined Coventry Polytechnic as Head of its Applied Social Studies Department. From 1988 to 1996, she was Professor of Applied Social Studies at the University of Warwick. She then worked at Lancaster University, before joining the University of York as Professor of Health Sciences in October 2005.

From 1996 to 2001, Graham was Director of the ESRC Health Variations Programme. She was a member of the Independent Inquiry into Inequalities in Health which reported in 1998. From 2005 to 2011, she was Director of the Department of Health's Public Health Research Consortium.

Honours
In the 2014 Queen's Birthday Honours, Graham was appointed a Commander of the Order of the British Empire (CBE) "for services to Public Health Research". In July 2016, she was elected a Fellow of the British Academy (FBA), the UK's national academy for the humanities and the social sciences.

Selected works

References

1950 births
Living people
Alumni of the University of York
British sociologists
British women sociologists
Academics of the University of Bradford
Academics of the Open University
Academics of Coventry University
Academics of the University of Warwick
Academics of Lancaster University
Academics of the University of York
Commanders of the Order of the British Empire
Fellows of the British Academy